Carl Anker Overgaard Jorgensen (February 5, 1911 – July 2, 1984) was a player in the National Football League.

Biography
Jorgensen was born on February 5, 1911. His brother Wagner O. Jorgensen was also a player in the National Football League.

Career
Jorgensen played at the collegiate level at St. Mary's College of California. While at St. Mary's he was named on several top All American teams as well as All Coast Player in 1933. 
He played with the Green Bay Packers during the 1934 NFL season. The following season, he played with the Philadelphia Eagles. After his time as a player with the Packers, he taught and coached football at Mount Shasta High School of California. Directly after this, he coached at Yuba Junior College of California. Then, in 1941 Jorgensen joined the Navy and worked as a Military Officer training cadets. While in the Navy, he was offered a football line coach position at Oregon State University. He moved to Oregon and worked as a line coach for three years. His fourth year at Oregon State, he taught business law and accounting. While coaching in Oregon, he attended Northwestern College of Law and graduated with a JD in 1950. That same year, Joe Ruetz, the head football coach at St. Mary's of California offered Jorgensen a line coach position. Jorgensen took the position at St. Mary's yet it lasted only a year since St. Mary's quit football in 1950.  After this, he took a football coaching job at College of Pacific (now known as the University of Pacific). The team went to the Sun bowl. 

Jorgensen left coaching in 1951 to work as a manager of cotton operations at Best Fertilizers. At this point Jorgensen decided to move to Southern California and took a job as Controller of the wind tunnel at California Institute of Technology. The wind tunnel closed and Jorgensen applied for a job at the Jet Propulsion Laboratory. He was the financial planning manager at JPL and held that position for twenty years. In retirement, he worked as a consultant for the Jet Propulsion Laboratory.

See also
List of Green Bay Packers players
List of Philadelphia Eagles players

References

External links
  

1911 births
1984 deaths
Green Bay Packers players
Philadelphia Eagles players
Saint Mary's Gaels football players